Trapčin Dol is a village in the municipality of Kičevo, North Macedonia.

Demographics
As of the 2021 census, Trapčin Dol had 357 residents with the following ethnic composition:
Albanians 339
Persons for whom data are taken from administrative sources 17
Macedonians 1

According to the 2002 census, the village had a total of 914 inhabitants. Ethnic groups in the village include:
Albanians 896
Macedonians 2
Others 16

References

External links

Villages in Kičevo Municipality
Albanian communities in North Macedonia